Eupithecia pluripunctaria is a moth in the family Geometridae. It is found in Libya.

References

Moths described in 1934
pluripunctaria
Moths of Africa